Wyoming Highway 431 (WYO 431) is a  Wyoming state road in western Washakie County and a small part of northern Hot Springs County. Highway 431 is locally named Gooseberry Creek Road for Gooseberry Creek which it follows for most of its routing.

Route description
Wyoming Highway 431 begins at Wyoming Highway 120 approximately 19 miles southeast of Meeteetse in northern Hot Springs County. WYO 431 proceeds northeast from Highway 120 until it reaches and crosses Gooseberry Creek. A mile later, the Gooseberry Scenic Area is reached, also named after the creek, which lies on the north side of the highway. The scenic area provides panoramic view of the landscape via an overlook. 
Nearing its end, Highway 431 turns southeasterly, still following Gooseberry Creek, before reaching its eastern end at US 20/WYO 789 and the southern terminus of Wyoming Highway 432 southwest of Worland.

Major intersections

References

External links 

Wyoming State Routes 400-499
WYO 431 - WYO 120 to US-20/WYO 789

Transportation in Hot Springs County, Wyoming
Transportation in Washakie County, Wyoming
431